Carole Boyd is a British actress. She has had a career in theatre, television, and radio, and plays Lynda Snell MBE in BBC Radio 4's The Archers.

Career
Boyd trained at the Birmingham School of Speech and Drama, where she won the principal national prize for voice and in 1966 joined the Radio Drama Company by winning the Carleton Hobbs Bursary. She is primarily recognised for her work in television, with her portrayals of Hetty Wainthrop Investigates, Virtual Murder and Mrs Melly in Bodger and Badger among her appearances. Boyd has also performed multiple vocal roles for the BBC children's programme Postman Pat. Since 1991, she has voiced every woman and child in the franchise - including Sara Clifton, Dr Gilbertson, Mrs Goggins, Miss Hubbard, Mrs Pottage, Dorothy Thompson, Lucy Selby, Tom and Katy Pottage, Charlie Pringle, and Julian Clifton, among others (with the exception of Granny Dryden, who continued to be voiced by Ken Barrie prior to his death in 2016). In 2006, she played Esther Hartlieb in the film The Thief Lord.

Personal life
Married to Patrick Harrison, Boyd has acted as part-time carer for her husband at their home in Shepperton since he suffered a stroke in 2003.

References

External links

Alumni of Birmingham School of Acting
British film actresses
British radio actresses
British television actresses
British voice actresses
Living people
Year of birth missing (living people)
Place of birth missing (living people)